In baseball statistics, an error is an act, in the judgment of the official scorer, of a fielder misplaying a ball in a manner that allows a batter or baserunner to advance one or more bases or allows an at bat to continue after the batter should have been put out.

Herman Long is the all-time leader in errors, committing 1,096 in his career. Bill Dahlen (1,080), Deacon White (1,018), and Germany Smith (1,009) are the only other players to commit over 1,000 career errors. Tommy Corcoran (992), Fred Pfeffer (980), Cap Anson (976), and John Montgomery Ward (952) are the only other players to commit over 900 career errors.

Key

List

References

Major League Baseball statistics
Major League Baseball lists